Jeremy Ireland (born 14 September 1938, Chester, died 16 July 2020) is an English former footballer. He played in the Football League for his local club Chester between 1957 and 1962.

Playing career
Ireland made his professional debut for Chester on 21 September 1957, shortly after his 19th birthday, in a 1–1 draw with Southport, with four goals being scored in 15 league matches before the end of the season. His season included a goal in a 9–2 demolition of York City.

By the closing stages of 1959–60, Ireland and Alec Croft were given runs in the side and they were joined by several other youngsters in the first team, as players including Jimmy Cooper, Gerry Citron, Colin Jones, Derek Owen and future star Ron Davies were given their chance.

Ireland remained with Chester for two more years before dropping into non–league football with Altrincham.

He later became a lecturer at Liverpool Polytechnic, which became Liverpool John Moores University, gaining an MSC from Heriot-Watt University in 1980, he lived and lectured In Singapore and later Hong Kong, before retiring from Liverpool John Moores University.

Bibliography

References

1938 births
Living people
English footballers
English Football League players
Association football forwards
Sportspeople from Chester
Chester City F.C. players
Altrincham F.C. players